Emivirine (MKC-442) is a failed experimental agent for the treatment of HIV.  It is a non-nucleoside reverse transcriptase inhibitor. While emivirine showed promising antiviral activity in vitro, it failed to show sufficient efficacy in human trials. However it is still notable as an early proof of concept, which led to the discovery of a number of related antiviral drugs.

References

Abandoned drugs
Non-nucleoside reverse transcriptase inhibitors
Pyrimidinediones
Isopropyl compounds
Benzyl compounds